Aquilegia ecalcarata is a species of flowering plant in the family Ranunculaceae, native to nearly all of China. As its synonym Semiaquilegia ecalcarata it has gained the Royal Horticultural Society's Award of Garden Merit.

References

ecalcarata
Endemic flora of China
Flora of Inner Mongolia
Flora of North-Central China
Flora of Qinghai
Flora of South-Central China
Flora of Southeast China
Flora of Tibet
Plants described in 1889